Qanat Zarshk-e Sofla (also Romanized as Qanāt Zarshk-e Soflá) is a village in Chahar Gonbad Rural District, in the Central District of Sirjan County, Kerman Province, Iran. At the 2006 census, its population was 19, in 5 families.

References 

Populated places in Sirjan County